Roter See is a lake in the Ludwigslust-Parchim district in Mecklenburg-Vorpommern, Germany. At an elevation of 23.1 m, its surface area is 0.071 km².

Lakes of Mecklenburg-Western Pomerania